Baron Berkeley of Stratton, in the County of Cornwall, was a title in the Peerage of England. It was created in 1658 for John Berkeley, 1st Baron Berkeley of Stratton, a Royalist during the Civil War who had distinguished himself at the Battle of Stratton, fought in 1643 at Stratton in Cornwall. He was a member of the Berkeley family of Bruton in Somerset, descended from Sir Maurice de Berkeley, a younger son of Maurice de Berkeley, 2nd Baron Berkeley (1271–1326) of Berkeley Castle in Gloucestershire, the senior line of the Berkeley family. His brother was Charles Berkeley, 2nd Viscount Fitzhardinge and his nephew was Charles Berkeley, 1st Earl of Falmouth. The 1st Baron's second son, the 3rd Baron (who succeeded his elder brother), was an Admiral in the Royal Navy who died without surviving issue and was succeeded by his younger brother, the 4th Baron, who served as First Lord of Trade between 1714 and 1715.

On his death, the title passed to his eldest son, the 5th Baron, Captain of the Yeomen of the Guard and Captain of the Honourable Corps of Gentlemen-Pensioners, who died childless in 1773 when the title became extinct. This branch of the family had as their London townhouse Berkeley House which was renamed and remodelled as Devonshire House on Piccadilly, stretching into mid-Mayfair; part of its gardens remain Berkeley Square, six other roads across this few-acre ex-holding are legacies of the family names: Berkeley Street, Stratton Street, Bruton Street, Bruton Place and Bruton Lane.

Barons Berkeley of Stratton (1658)
John Berkeley, 1st Baron Berkeley of Stratton (1607–1678)
Charles Berkeley, 2nd Baron Berkeley of Stratton (1662–1681)
John Berkeley, 3rd Baron Berkeley of Stratton (c. 1663–1697)
William Berkeley, 4th Baron Berkeley of Stratton (d. 1741)
John Berkeley, 5th Baron Berkeley of Stratton (d. 1773)

The latter died without progeny and left the bulk of his wealth to the 5th Earl Berkeley, a remote cousin on several sides; that title is dormant but was until 1882 co-held with the barony holder for the time being which passes through daughters as de jure Baronesses; such holder is the 5th Earl's seniormost heir.

See also
Baron Berkeley
Earl FitzHardinge
Viscount FitzHardinge
Baron FitzHardinge

References

1658 establishments in England
Extinct baronies in the Peerage of England
Baron
 
Noble titles created in 1658